The 2017–18 winter transfer window for English football transfers opened on 1 January and closes on 1 February. Additionally, players without a club may join at any time, clubs may sign players on loan at any time, and clubs may sign a goalkeeper on an emergency loan if they have no registered goalkeeper available. This list includes transfers featuring at least one Premier League or Football League Championship club which were completed after the end of the summer 2017 transfer window and before the end of the 2017–18 winter window.

Transfers

 Player officially joined his club on 1 January 2018.

References

England
Winter 2017-18